The 1914 Oklahoma Sooners football team represented the University of Oklahoma in the 1914 college football season. In their 10th year under head coach Bennie Owen, the Sooners compiled a 9–1–1 record, and outscored their opponents by a combined total of 440 to 96.

Schedule

References

Oklahoma
Oklahoma Sooners football seasons
Oklahoma Sooners football